Pulse-amplitude modulation (PAM) is a form of signal modulation where the message information is encoded in the amplitude of a series of signal pulses. It is an analog pulse modulation scheme in which the amplitudes of a train of carrier pulses are varied according to the sample value of the message signal. Demodulation is performed by detecting the amplitude level of the carrier at every single period.

Types
There are two types of pulse amplitude modulation:
 In single polarity PAM, a suitable fixed DC bias is added to the signal to ensure that all the pulses are positive. 
 In double polarity PAM, the pulses are both positive and negative.

Pulse-amplitude modulation is widely used in modulating signal transmission of digital data, with non-baseband applications having been largely replaced by pulse-code modulation, and, more recently, by pulse-position modulation.

The number of possible pulse amplitudes in analog PAM is theoretically infinite. Digital PAM reduces the number of pulse amplitudes to some power of two. For example, in 4-level PAM there are  possible discrete pulse amplitudes; in 8-level PAM there are  possible discrete pulse amplitudes; and in 16-level PAM there are  possible discrete pulse amplitudes.

Uses

Ethernet
Some versions of the Ethernet communication standard are an example of PAM usage. In particular, 100BASE-T4 and BroadR-Reach Ethernet standard use three-level PAM modulation (PAM-3), while 1000BASE-T Gigabit Ethernet uses five-level PAM-5 modulation and 10GBASE-T 10 Gigabit Ethernet uses a Tomlinson-Harashima Precoded (THP) version of pulse-amplitude modulation with 16 discrete levels (PAM-16), encoded in a two-dimensional checkerboard pattern known as DSQ128.  25 Gigabit Ethernet and some copper variants of 100 Gigabit Ethernet and 200 Gigabit Ethernet use PAM-4 modulation.

USB
USB4 Version 2.0 uses PAM-3 signaling for USB4 80Gbps (USB4 Gen 4×2) and USB4 120Gbps (USB4 Gen 4 Asymmetric) transmitting 3 bits per 2 clock cycles. Thunderbolt 5 uses the same PHY.

GDDR6X
GDDR6X, developed by Micron and Nvidia and first used in the Nvidia RTX 3080 and 3090 graphics cards, uses PAM4 signaling to transmit 2 bits per clock cycle without having to resort to higher frequencies or two channels or lanes with associated transmitters and receivers, which may increase power or space consumption and cost. Higher frequencies require higher bandwidth, which is a significant problem beyond 28 GHz when trying to transmit through copper. PAM4 costs more to implement than earlier NRZ (non return to zero, PAM2) coding partly because it requires more space in integrated circuits, and is more susceptible to SNR (signal to noise ratio) problems.

GDDR7
GDDR7 will utilize PAM-3 signaling to achieve speeds of 36 Gbps/pin. The higher data transmission rate per cycle compared to NRZ/PAM2-signaling used by GDDR6 and prior generations improves power efficiency and signal integrity.

PCI Express
PCI Express 6.0 has introduced PAM usage.

Photo biology
The concept is also used for the study of photosynthesis using a specialized instrument that involves a spectrofluorometric measurement of the kinetics of fluorescence rise and decay in the light-harvesting antenna of thylakoid membranes, thus querying various aspects of the state of the photosystems under different environmental conditions. Unlike the traditional dark-adapted chlorophyll fluorescence measurements, pulse amplitude fluorescence devices allow measuring under ambient light conditions, which made measurements significantly more versatile.

Electronic drivers for LED lighting
Pulse-amplitude modulation has also been developed for the control of light-emitting diodes (LEDs), especially for lighting applications. LED drivers based on the PAM technique offer improved energy efficiency over systems based upon other common driver modulation techniques such as pulse-width modulation (PWM) as the forward current passing through an LED is relative to the intensity of the light output and the LED efficiency increases as the forward current is reduced.

Pulse-amplitude modulation LED drivers are able to synchronize pulses across multiple LED channels to enable perfect color matching. Due to the inherent nature of PAM in conjunction with the rapid switching speed of LEDs, it is possible to use LED lighting as a means of wireless data transmission at high speed.

Digital television
The North American Advanced Television Systems Committee standards for digital television uses a form of PAM to broadcast the data that makes up the television signal. This system, known as 8VSB, is based on an eight-level PAM. It uses additional processing to suppress one sideband and thus make more efficient use of limited bandwidth. Using a single 6 MHz channel allocation, as defined in the previous NTSC analog standard, 8VSB is capable of transmitting 32 Mbit/s. After accounting for error-correcting codes and other overhead, the data rate in the signal is 19.39 Mbit/s.

See also

 8VSB
 Amplitude-shift keying
 Carrier Sense Multiple Access
 Pulse-density modulation
 Pulse forming network
 Quadrature amplitude modulation (QAM)

Notes

References

Quantized radio modulation modes